Paolo Andrea Pietro Vernazza (born 1 November 1979) is an English former footballer who played as a midfielder.

Career
Vernazza started his career at Arsenal but struggled to break into the first team. His development as a player may have been hampered by injuries sustained in an incident with a burglar in his home in 2001, in which Vernazza and fellow Arsenal trainee Andrew Douglas were both stabbed.  He made his first-team debut in a League Cup match against Birmingham City on 14 October 1997. He only played one league game (against Crystal Palace) as Arsenal won the 1997-98 FA Premier League, meaning he didn't qualify for a winners' medal. His performances in Arsenal's reserves resulted in him gaining a place in the England squad for the 1999 FIFA World Youth Championship. He had loan spells at Ipswich Town and Portsmouth, before leaving Arsenal for Watford in December 2000. He played 11 times for Arsenal, scoring one goal, in a 2–1 win over Coventry City on 16 September 2000.

Vernazza spent three-and-a-half years at Watford, making 96 league appearances, before moving to Rotherham United in the summer of 2004 on a free.

Paolo's time at Rotherham was largely unsuccessful, resulting in him spending a loan spell at Barnet before being released in May 2006.

Following a successful trial, Vernazza signed for Dagenham & Redbridge on 14 December 2006. He was part of the squad that helped Dagenham gain promotion to the Football League for the first time in the club's history, winning the Conference National in the 2006–07 season.

He joined Weymouth on 9 July 2007.

Vernazza appeared as a substitute for Crawley Town in a pre-season game against former club Arsenal on 26 July 2008. However, on 6 August 2008 he signed for another Conference club, Woking, following a successful trial.

On 4 September 2009, Vernazza signed for Grays Athletic, before leaving in February 2010. He joined Hemel Hempstead Town in March. In September 2010, he joined Bishop's Stortford.

He retired from football in 2011. He is now a player agent for various youth players.

Honours
Arsenal
FA Charity Shield: 1999

References

External links

1979 births
Living people
Footballers from Islington (district)
English footballers
England youth international footballers
England under-21 international footballers
Association football midfielders
Arsenal F.C. players
Ipswich Town F.C. players
Portsmouth F.C. players
Watford F.C. players
Rotherham United F.C. players
Barnet F.C. players
Dagenham & Redbridge F.C. players
Weymouth F.C. players
Woking F.C. players
Grays Athletic F.C. players
Hemel Hempstead Town F.C. players
Premier League players
English Football League players
National League (English football) players
Bishop's Stortford F.C. players